Veronesi is an Italian surname. Notable people with the surname include:

Alberto Veronesi (born 1967), Italian conductor
Giovanni Veronesi (born 1962), Italian film director, screenwriter and actor
Gustavo Veronesi (born 1982), Brazilian footballer
Luigi Veronesi (1908–1998), Italian photographer, painter, scenographer and film director
Pietro Veronesi, American economist
Sandro Veronesi (born 1959), Italian writer and journalist
Umberto Veronesi (1925–2016), Italian physician and politician

Italian-language surnames
Italian toponymic surnames